Ljungarum Church is a church building in Jönköping in Sweden. It belongs to Jönköping Christina-Ljungarum Parish of the Church of Sweden. The building dates back to the 13th century.

References

External links

Churches in Jönköping
13th-century churches in Sweden
Churches in the Diocese of Växjö